Kaaseman F.C. is a Ghanaian football club based in Sefwi-Kaase, Ghana. The club are competing in the GAFCOA. The club is run by Prempeh College's Mr. Asare Lartey, and the Owarean sports master in Orlando, Florida, United States, which also operates Kaaseman F.C. in Kumasi, Ghana.

Notable players
 Kwadwo Asamoah
 Patrick Nyarko
 Martin Osei Nyarko

Football clubs in Ghana
Ashanti Region